Gnorimoschema segregatum is a moth in the family Gelechiidae. It was described by Povolný in 1998. It is found in North America, where it has been recorded from Saskatchewan.

References

Gnorimoschema
Moths described in 1998